Birth of John the Baptist is a c. 1485–1490 tempera on panel painting by Luca Signorelli. Originally part of the predella of an unknown altarpiece (though Raffaele Caracciolo definitively linked it to the Sant'Onofrio Altarpiece), it was acquired on the art market in 1824 by the Louvre, where it still hangs in the Salle des Sept-Mètres.

History and art review
The painting is thought to be an early work of Signorelli. It is unusually cursive in style for the artist, and is notable as an experiment in the use of dramatic lighting. The Birth of John the Baptist has been called one of the best examples of the work of Signorelli.

References

Paintings by Luca Signorelli
Paintings in the Louvre by Italian artists
1490 paintings
Paintings depicting John the Baptist
Paintings of Elizabeth (biblical figure)]
Altarpieces